The 1971 LPGA Tour was the 22nd season since the LPGA Tour officially began in 1950. The season ran from February 18 to October 17. The season consisted of 20 official money events. Kathy Whitworth won the most tournaments, five. She also led the money list with earnings of $41,181.

The season saw the first $10,000 first prize at the Sears Women's World Classic won by Ruth Jessen. There were four first-time winners in 1971: Pam Barnett, Jan Ferraris, Pam Higgins, and Sandra Palmer.

The tournament results and award winners are listed below.

Tournament results
The following table shows all the official money events for the 1971 season. "Date" is the ending date of the tournament. The numbers in parentheses after the winners' names are the number of wins they had on the tour up to and including that event. Majors are shown in bold.

Awards

References

External links
LPGA Tour official site
1971 season coverage at golfobserver.com

LPGA Tour seasons
LPGA Tour